

Highest-grossing films

List of films
A list of films released in Japan in 1998 (see 1998 in film).

See also
1998 in Japan
1998 in Japanese television

References

Bibliography

External links
 Japanese films of 1998 at the Internet Movie Database

1998
Lists of 1998 films by country or language
Films